Höskuldur Þórhallsson (born 8 March 1973) is an Icelandic politician and a former member of the Althing, the Icelandic parliament. He is a member of the Progressive Party. He served as President of the Nordic Council in 2015.

External links
Althing biography

Living people
1973 births
Hoskuldur Thorhallsson
Hoskuldur Thorhallsson